Unity School District is a kindergarten through 12th grade school district located in between Balsam Lake, Wisconsin and Milltown, Wisconsin on Highway 46.

Communities served by Unity School District
Apple River, Wisconsin
Balsam Lake, Wisconsin
Centuria, Wisconsin
Eureka, Wisconsin
Georgetown, Wisconsin
Johnstown, Wisconsin
Laketown, Wisconsin
Milltown, Wisconsin
St. Croix Falls, Wisconsin

References

External links
Unity School District
Elementary School
Middle School
High School

School districts in Wisconsin
Education in Polk County, Wisconsin